The Revue économique is a peer-reviewed academic journal published six times per year. It covers formal economics and other social sciences including history and sociology of relevance for economics. Articles are in French or English.

History 
The first issue of the Revue économique was published in May, 1950. Founders included economic historian Fernand Braudel, Albert Aftalion, who presided over the journal's board of directors ("comité de direction"). and Émile James (1899-1991), Étienne Labrousse (1895-1989), Jean Lhomme (1901-1987), Jean Marchal (1905-1995), Jean Meynaud (1914-1972), Henri Noyelle (1882-1966), Jean Weiller (1905-2000). Until 1977, the journal was published by Armand Colin and since 1978 by the Presses de Sciences Po.

Here are some of the authors who have published articles in the journal: John Abowd, Raymond Aron, Raymond Barre, Charles Bettelheim, François Bloch-Lainé, Roger Guesnerie, Francis Kramarz, Denis Kessler, Serge Christophe Kolm, Jean-Jacques Laffont, Wassily Léontief, Edmond Malinvaud, Pierre Mendès-France, Alfred Sauvy, Dominique Strauss-Kahn, Jacques Rueff, Jan Tinbergen, Jean Tirole.

Prize of Revue économique 
Every two years, the Prize is awarded  to an author who published in the journal, for the whole of his/her work.

 2012 : Claude Henry
 2014 : Marc Fleurbaey
 2016 : David Martimort
 2018 : Marie Claire Villeval
 2020 : Philippe Mongin
 2022 : Jean-Marc Robin

References

External links 
 
 Archives on Cairn.info
 Archives on Persée
 Archives on Jstor

Economics journals
Multilingual journals
Publications established in 1950
Bimonthly journals
Delayed open access journals
1950 establishments in France